The men's Greco-Roman heavyweight competition at the 1948 Summer Olympics in London took place from 3 to 6 August at the Empress Hall, Earls Court Exhibition Centre. Nations were limited to one competitor.

This Greco-Roman wrestling competition continued to use the "bad points" elimination system introduced at the 1928 Summer Olympics for Greco-Roman and at the 1932 Summer Olympics for freestyle wrestling, with the slight modification introduced in 1936. Each round featured all wrestlers pairing off and wrestling one bout (with one wrestler having a bye if there were an odd number). The loser received three points if the loss was by fall or unanimous decision and two points if the decision was 2–1 (this was the modification from prior years, where all losses were three points). The winner received one point if the win was by decision and zero points if the win was by fall. At the end of each round, any wrestler with at least five points was eliminated.

Results

Round 1

 Bouts

 Points

Round 2

 Bouts

 Points

Round 3

 Bouts

 Points

Round 4

After three rounds, the three medalists were decided and they wrestled to determine who received which medal. Kireççi had beaten Nilsson previously (in round 2), so the two would not wrestle each other again. The draw resulted in Fantoni facing Nilsson in round 4 and Kireççi in round 5. Nilsson would have taken bronze with a loss, but guaranteed himself at least silver by winning by fall.

 Bouts

 Points

Round 5

Kirecci won the final match to take the gold medal; Fantoni's loss put him in third place.

 Bouts

 Points

References

Wrestling at the 1948 Summer Olympics